DISNOVATION.ORG (sometimes referred to as the disnovation.org working group) is a contemporary art duo of Maria Roszkowska and Nicolas Maigret based in Paris, France, that develops installations, publications and events about technology and politics.

Their work has been presented at Centre Pompidou, Transmediale, Museum of Art and Design and the Science Gallery, Dublin.

Selected works

The Pirate Cinema

The Pirate Cinema (2012-2014) is a video installation that uses a computer that constantly downloads the 100 most viewed torrents on a tracker website, intercepts the currently downloading video/audio snippets, projects them on the screen with the information on their origin and destination, discards them and repeats the process with the next stream in the download que.

Predictive Art Bot

Predictive Art Bot (2015-2017) is an algorithm for predicting artistic concepts.

Publications

The Pirate Book (2015) A compilation of stories about sharing, distributing and experiencing cultural contents outside the boundaries of local economies, politics, or laws.

Notes

Hacker culture
International artist groups and collectives
Internet-based activism
New media artists